Aeluros Inc was a semiconductor company developing integrated circuits for wireline communications - for Ethernet operating at 10 Gigabits per second. The company was founded in 2001, and produced physical layer ICs used in 10GE line cards and optical modules (such as XENPAK, SFP, XFP).

Aeluros was the first to produce a XAUI transceiver dissipating less than 1 Watt of power, a transceiver that can drive directly a 10 Gbit/s VCSEL, and a transceiver with integrated Electronic Dispersion Compensation for 10GE using Multi-mode optical fiber.

Aeluros merged with NetLogic Microsystems in October 2007 in a deal exceeding $70M. Netlogic Microsystems was subsequently acquired by Broadcom in February 2012 for $3.7B.

External links 
 Official website
 Technology description

References 

Manufacturing companies established in 2001
Electronics companies of the United States
Companies based in Mountain View, California
Companies established in 2001
2001 establishments in California